Juan Andres Noguera Ramirez (born 10 September 1984) is a Paraguayan footballer (Midfielder). Currently, he plays for Rapid KL FC in KLFA League Division 1 with signing contract 4 years until 2018.

External links
 Profile in Liga Indonesia Official Website

1984 births
Living people
Paraguayan footballers
Expatriate footballers in Indonesia
Liga 1 (Indonesia) players
Pelita Bandung Raya players
Association football forwards